Abū l-Ḥajjāj Mujāhid ibn Jabr al-Qāriʾ (642–722 CE) was a Tabi‘ and one of the major early Islamic scholars. His tafsīr of the Qur'an (exegesis/commentary) is believed to be the earliest existing written exegetical source, although only fragments of it have reached us from the Umayyad era.

Biography
He was  one of the leading Qur'anic commentators and a translator of the generation after that of the Prophet Muhammad and his Companions. He is the first to compile a written exegesis of the Qur'an, in which he stated “It is not permissible for one who holds faith in Allah and the Day of Judgment to speak on the Qur'an without learning classical Arabic.” He is said to have studied under Amir al-Mu'minin 'Ali ibn Abi Talib until his martyrdom.  At that point, he began to study under Ibn Abbas, a companion of the Prophet known as the father of Qur'anic exegesis.  Mujahid ibn Jabr was known to be willing to go to great lengths to discover the true meaning of a verse in the Qur'an, and was considered to be a well-travelled man. However, there is no evidence he ever journeyed outside of the Arabian Peninsula.

Works
It is related by Ibn Sa'd in the Tabaqat (6:9) and elsewhere that he went over the explanation of the Qur'an together with Ibn 'Abbas thirty times.

Mujahid ibn Jabr is said to be relied upon in terms of tafsir according  to Sufyan al-Thawri, who said: "If you get Mujahid's tafsir, it is enough for you."

His exegesis in general followed these four principles:
 That the Qur'an can be explained by other parts of the Qur'an. For example, in his interpretation of Q 29:13, he refers to Q 16:25,
 Interpretation according to traditions,
 Reason,
 Literary comments.

Al-Tabari's Jami' al-bayan attributes a significant amount of exegetical material to Mujahid.

Legacy

The view of Islamic Scholarship
He has been classed as a Thiqah (i.e. very reliable) hadith narrator.

Al-A'mash said:
''"Mujahid was like someone who carried a treasure: whenever he spoke, pearls came out of his mouth."

After praising him in similar terms al-Dhahabi said: "The Ummah is unanimous on Mujahid being an Imam who is worthy in Ihtijaj.

See also
Qira'at
Ahruf
Ten recitations
Seven readers

References

External links
 Mujaahid ibn Jabr (مُجَاهِدْ بِنْ جَبْر) – Siyar A`laamin Nubalaa of Imaam adh-Dhahabee | Dawud Burbank
 Biography of Mujahid
  Complete biography of Mujahid Ibn Jabr

642 births
720s deaths
Tabi‘un
Tabi‘un hadith narrators
7th-century Arabs
8th-century Arabs
People from Mecca
Scholars from the Umayyad Caliphate
Quranic exegesis scholars
Quran reciters